Lorbamate (INN; Abbott-19,957) is a muscle relaxant and tranquilizer of the carbamate family which was never marketed.

See also
Nisobamate
Tybamate

References 

Carbamates
Muscle relaxants
Sedatives
GABAA receptor positive allosteric modulators
Abandoned drugs
Cyclopropyl compounds